Omer Arbel (born 1976) is a multidisciplinary artist and designer based in Vancouver. His output is broad, including materials research, lighting design, building design and site specific installations. He is one of two co-founders of Bocci, a Canadian design and manufacturing company. Arbel's designs are numbered in order of creation (1.1 – 113 at the time of writing). Arbel invents processes (manual, mechanical, or chemical) that generate novel forms, privileging analog processes and traditional skills such as glassblowing, concrete forming, and metalwork as ongoing sources of inspiration and innovation. The objects, installations, and buildings realized in this way are to some degree unpredictable and variable, a meeting place between nature and technology, a potentially endless series of exceptions for which there is no restrictive rule.

Early life
Arbel was born and raised in Jerusalem until age thirteen, when his family relocated to Vancouver, British Columbia, Canada. As a youth, Arbel enjoyed considerable success as a competitive fencer, making the Canadian Junior National team numerous times and ranking in the top 20 at the Junior World Championships. He competed in fencing for Team Canada at the 1993 Maccabiah Games in Israel.

He received a BSc in environmental science from the University of Waterloo in 1997, and began an apprenticeship with Catalan architect Enric Miralles the following year. Miralles’ death in 2000 brought Arbel back to Canada, where he completed his professional degree in architecture and began working at Patkau Architects in Vancouver.

Industrial Design 

Omer Arbel is the co-founder of Bocci - a design and manufacturing company based in Vancouver and Berlin. Founded in 2005 under the artistic principles of Omer Arbel’s method, Bocci is committed to fostering a lateral and open-ended relationship between creative direction and craft. The company launched with one lighting design, ‘14’, which was immediately successful and remains a design staple and bestseller. The realization that the most successful aspects of 14 were unintended, being rather a consequence of material properties or process, was the impetus for defining Arbel’s open ended method.

Large, site-specific lighting installations based on Bocci works have been on view at public art institutions such as the Victoria & Albert Museum, London and the Barbican, London.

In 2015 Bocci opened a 2200qm exhibition space in Berlin.  The showroom closed in 2020. Bocci will open a new, permanent exhibition space, also in Berlin, in 2021.

Architecture

Arbel launched his own building design practice (OAO) in 2005. Since then he has completed several commercial and residential projects, including 23.2, a freestanding house located in South Surrey, B.C, Canada.
23.2 began with a depository of reclaimed, century-old Douglas Fir beams from the local forests of British Columbia. The project regards the beams as archaeological artifacts resulting from the social and ecological history of the region, as such, they were not milled, cut, or finished, with massive geometrical consequence to the plan. Arbel has been shortlisted for the World Architecture Award three times  and won a World Architecture Festival Award in 2019 for his project 75.9 - a house constructed on a hay farm in the Canadian Pacific Northwest. The project makes use of a technique of pouring concrete into fabric formwork deployed within plywood rib structures, yielding walls, and columnar roof forms. A deliberately slow, continuous pour and special concrete mix are employed to create each element, in some cases approaching 10 meters tall. The fabric formed concrete elements are treated as if they were found archeological ruins in the hayfield landscape, with the house considered a contemporary construction built around and among them. Differing height and position for each column creates a cinematographic narrative of domestic habitation. The trumpet shape of each column is hollow, allowing the planting of mature trees on the inhabited roofscape.

Omer’s built work has been exhibited at both the Surrey Art Gallery  and the Aedes Architekturforum in Berlin.

Sculpture

Omer Arbel’s first solo exhibition of sculptural work was shown at the Monte Clark Gallery in Vancouver, B.C. in 2015. The show featured two series of works, one based on glass fusing experiments, and the other based on electroplating experiments. In 2018, Omer Arbel’s molten beeswax candle was included in Raw Design – a group exhibition curated by Glenn Adamson at the Museum of Craft and Design in San Francisco. In 2020, Omer Arbel showed a new series of sculptural works at Carwan Gallery in Athens. The show consisted of 103 unique copper objects and marked the launch of Carwan Gallerie’s new exhibition space in Athens.

Special Projects

In 2010 Arbel was selected to co-design Canada's 2010 Olympic medals in collaboration with Aboriginal artist Corrine Hunt.   His original submission 27.3 included plans for the medals to be held together by invisible magnets, concealing a cavity on the inside where an athlete could store a memento, and having an onsite engraver etch the sounds of the last ten minutes before a medal event onto the medal itself.  Financial and practical concerns prevented these plans from being realized, however Arbel's desire to design a system of production that resulted each medal having unique form was preserved.

Arbel's work has been selected for large-scale public installations that hover between artwork and industrial design. He has had multiple exhibitions at Spazio Rossana Orlandi in Milan, the Art Institute of Chicago, and more recently at the Fairmont Pacific Rim Vancouver, Mallett Antiques, Canada House, and the Victoria and Albert Museum in London. 
	The 2013 Victoria and Albert Museum exhibit featured 280 of the 28 spheres cascading more than 30 metres from the museum's vaulted ceiling.  In 2014, Arbel collaborated with Mallett Antiques to outfit their entire showroom with large installations of his 57 series, 38 series, 19 series and 28 series. The project was intended to create compositional tension through the juxtaposition of modern lighting with antique furnishings. Canada House on Trafalgar Square was reopened in February 2015 with the addition of 157 of Arbel's 57 series light winding down the central staircase. On March 5, 2015 Arbel unveiled a large outdoor installation of his new 16 series at Vancouver's Fairmont Pacific Rim Hotel. The Royal Architectural Institute of Canada (RAIC) announced on March 16, 2015 that Arbel would be awarded the Allied Arts Medal for 2015 based on his recent work at the Victoria and Albert Museum. The award is given once every two years to a Canadian artist or designer for outstanding achievement in artwork designed to be integrated with architecture.

Arbel is active as a guest critic, speaker and master's thesis committee member at the University of British Columbia School of Architecture. In 2012, Arbel taught a master class on form at Parsons The New School for Design.

Omer Arbel's first monograph published by Phaidon is due to launch on June 23, 2021. "A dynamic, highly visual, and in-depth study of the celebrated multi-disciplinary designer and master of sculptural lighting"

See also
 List of University of Waterloo people

References

External links 
 Omer Arbel Office website
 BOCCI website
 2010 Olympic Medals
 Vancouver Penthouse
 Omer Arbel Profile
 16 at the Fairmont
 Vancouver Maneuvers, interview with Omer Arbel in Dwell
 omer arbel office: seating, Designboom
 omer arbel office: lighting, Designboom
  23.2 house in Wallpaper
 
 omer arbel UBC Thesis Reviews
 UBC School of Architecture Curriculum Proposal
 Dezeen - V&A Museum
 London Design Festival
 Vancouver Sun - Canada House
 Monte Clark Gallery
 RAIC Announcement

Artists from Vancouver
Canadian industrial designers
Canadian sculptors
Canadian male sculptors
Canadian architects
Competitors at the 1993 Maccabiah Games
University of Waterloo alumni
Artists from Jerusalem
1976 births
Living people
Israeli Jews
Israeli emigrants to Canada
Jewish architects
Jewish Canadian artists
Jewish Canadian sportspeople
Maccabiah Games competitors for Canada
Maccabiah Games fencers